is a 1980 animated feature film directed by Yugo Serikawa, Kimio Yabuki and Tetsuo Imazawa, produced by Toei Animation from Japan in partnership with Soyuzmultfilm from the Soviet Union. It was based on the 1943 play written by Samuil Marshak which itself was based on the medieval fairy tale of the same name. The music was composed by Vladimir Ivanovich Krivtsov and performed by the National Leningrad Philharmonic under the direction of A. S. Dmitriev.

Preceded by The Wild Swans (1977) and Thumbelina (1978), and followed by Swan Lake (1981) and Aladdin and the Wonderful Lamp (1982), it represents the third episode in Toei's World Masterpiece Fairy Tales movie series.

Plot synopsis
A spoiled, young queen asks for the impossible during a cold winter and requests for a bouquet of Galanthus, a spring wildflower, for New Year's Day in exchange for a reward of gold. One greedy woman desires to collect the bounty and instead of sending her own daughter, readily sends her young stepdaughter, Anja, to look for the white-blossomed flowers in the deep forest during a night snowstorm despite knowing the task will be impossible. Despite refusing, Anja is cast into the blizzard by her stepmother and in the barren forest, falls unconscious from the freezing cold. Later, she is awoken and is drawn to a light in the distance from a mysterious bonfire, surrounded by spirits whom reveal themselves as the Twelve Months. Learning of her task, the twelve spirits take pity on Anja. They use their powers to temporarily bring spring to allow the flowers to grow and be collected but requests no one is to know how and where she obtained the Galanthus. A grateful Anja returns home with the requested flowers and the bouquet is presented to the Queen by her stepmother and stepsister. However, the dissatisfied queen wishes to see where the flowers grow for herself.

Cast

Additional Voices
Original: Hidekatsu Shibata.
English: Ray Owens, Pierre Cache, and John Belucci.

Music 
Opening Theme

 "I Won't Cry" (泣かないわ, Nakanai wa) 

 Sung by Mari Yoshiko with The Glinka Choir, lyrics by Kimio Yabuki, music and arrangement by Vladimir Krivstov, performed by National Leningrad Philharmonic.
Ending Theme
 "The Forest That Lives" (泣かないわ, Nakanai wa)

 Sung by Mari Yoshiko with The Glinka Choir, lyrics by Kimio Yabuki, music and arrangement by Vladimir Krivstov, performed by National Leningrad Philharmonic.

See also
 List of animated feature films of 1980

References

External links
 
 

1980 anime films
1980 in the Soviet Union
Anime and manga based on fairy tales
Fantasy anime and manga
Films based on fairy tales
Films based on Russian folklore
Soviet animated films
Toei Animation films
Toei Company films
1980 films
Soyuzmultfilm
Films directed by Yûgo Serikawa